Speed Up or Speedup may refer to:

Computing
 Speedup or speed up, a metric for relative performance improvement established by Amdahl's law
 Speedup theorem, in computational complexity theory

Music
 "Speed up", a song on the album Heart Attack by Krokus
 Speed Up / Slow Down, an EP by South
 "Speed Up" (Kara song), a song by Kara

Other uses
 Speed Up, an Italian motorcycle manufacturer